A list of films produced in the United Kingdom in 1948:

1948

See also
 1948 in British music
 1948 in British television
 1948 in the United Kingdom

References

External links
 

1948
British
1940s in British cinema
Fil